Ridsdale is a surname, and may refer to:

 Peter Ridsdale (born 1952), English businessman
 Julian Ridsdale (1915–2004), British National Liberal and later Conservative Party politician
 Aurelian Ridsdale (1864–1923), British Liberal politician
 Paddy Ridsdale (1921–2009), Ian Fleming's secretary during World War II and the model for Miss Moneypenny
 Gerald Ridsdale, convicted child molester who abused children while working as a Catholic priest
 George Ridsdale (born 1878), English professional footballer who played as a wing half
 Charles Henry Ridsdale (1873–1952), Anglican Bishop

Ridsdale is also the name of a village in Corsenside, and an old spelling of Redesdale, both in Northumberland, England.